Sundaram Perumal Rajadurai (born 26 March 1967) is a Sri Lankan attorney-at-law, politician and former Member of Parliament.

Early life and family
Rajadurai was born on 26 March 1967. His family were estate workers at the Rockland estate in Udapussellawa. He studied at Suriyagaha Pathana Tamil Vidyalayam and Ragala Tamil Vidyalayam.

Career
Rajadurai is an attorney-at-law, acting magistrate and president of the Nuwara Eliya Rotary Club.

Rajadurai contested the 2010 parliamentary election as one of the United People's Freedom Alliance's (UPFA) candidates in Nuwara Eliya District. He was elected and entered Parliament. On 8 August 2013 Rajadurai left the Ceylon Workers' Congress to sit as an independent MP supporting UPFA. He joined the National Union of Workers as its deputy leader on 18 August 2013.

Rajadurai resigned from the UPFA on 21 November 2014 to support common opposition candidate Maithripala Sirisena at the presidential election. He joined the United National Party (UNP) on 25 November 2014. He was appointed the UNP organizer for Nuwara Eliya. He failed to get re-elected at the 2015 parliamentary election after coming eighth amongst the United National Front for Good Governance candidates.

Electoral history

References

1967 births
Ceylon Workers' Congress politicians
Living people
Indian Tamil lawyers of Sri Lanka
Indian Tamil politicians of Sri Lanka
Members of the 14th Parliament of Sri Lanka
People from Central Province, Sri Lanka
Sri Lankan Hindus
United National Party politicians
United People's Freedom Alliance politicians